Aw Sian also known as Sally Aw, OBE, DStJ, JP, (born 1932) is a Hong Kong businesswoman and daughter of the British Raj Burma-born entrepreneur and newspaper proprietor Aw Boon-haw. Sally Aw was nicknamed Tiger Balm Lady as well as Chinese Howard Hughes.

Early life
Sally Aw was born in 1932 during the British Raj. At age 5, Sally was adopted by fellow relative Aw Boon Haw.

Aw Boon-haw's third son Aw Hoe was killed in a plane crash in 1951 and after his own death in 1954, Aw Sian, then 22, inherited the newspaper empire of Hong Kong.

Aw was known foremost as a media mogul, proprietor of the English language business newspaper The Standard and the Chinese language news group Sing Tao Holdings, including Sing Tao Daily and Sing Tao Wan Pao, founded by her father in 1938, as well as  she founded in 1963 and Tin Tin Daily News she owned via Sing Tao Holdings' listed subsidiary  (better known as its Hong Kong subsidiary Jademan Holdings)

Due to the Asian financial crisis and a corruption case in which she was named co-conspirator in 1998,  Aw was forced to sell her media interests.

In 1997, Aw was appointed to be a delegate to the Chinese People's Political Consultative Conference from the Hong Kong Special Administrative Region.

Industry recognition
In 1988, she won the Carr Van Anda Award from the E.W. Scripps School of Journalism at Ohio University. The award, named after the former managing editor of the New York Times, is awarded yearly for journalism contributions. Aw was given the award for building Sing Tao into an international Chinese-language newspaper.

References

Further reading 
Dealing With the Dragon: A Year in the New Hong Kong

External links
 Entry in offshore leaks database

1932 births
Living people
Aw family
Hong Kong newspaper people
Hong Kong people of Hakka descent
Burmese people of Chinese descent
People from Yongding District, Longyan
Hong Kong women in business
Officers of the Order of the British Empire
Members of the National Committee of the Chinese People's Political Consultative Conference
Hong Kong politicians
Sing Tao News Corporation